Joseph Crisco Jr. (born June 2, 1934) is an American politician and former Connecticut Senator.

Senator Crisco holds a bachelor of science degree in accounting from the University of Connecticut and studied at the graduate level at Trinity College in Hartford. Raised in New Haven, he lives in Woodbridge.

Crisco was first elected to the 17th district of the Connecticut Senate in 1992, serving for twelve terms until 2017 when he lost re-election to George Logan.

References

1934 births
Living people
Democratic Party Connecticut state senators